George F. Garrity (March 17, 1895 – February 27, 1967) was an American attorney who served as the United States Attorney for the District of Massachusetts from 1946 to 1947 and again from 1949 to 1953.

References

United States Attorneys for the District of Massachusetts
1895 births
1967 deaths